Joseph McLoughney (10 June 1887 – 13 January 1962) was an Irish hurler who played for the Tipperary senior team.

Born in Thurles, County Tipperary, McLoughney first arrived on the inter-county scene when he first linked up with the Tipperary senior team. He made his senior debut during the 1906 championship. McLoughney went on to play a key role for the team over the next decade, and won one All-Ireland medal and two Munster medals. He was an All-Ireland runner-up on one occasion.

At club level McLoughney was a five-time championship medallist with Thurles.

His retirement came following the conclusion of the 1913 championship.

In retirement from playing McLoughney became involved in team management and coaching. He was a selector with the Tipperary senior team in 1924.

Honours

Team

Thurles
Tipperary Senior Club Hurling Championship (5) 1906, 1907, 1908, 1909, 1911

Tipperary
All-Ireland Senior Hurling Championship (1): 1908
Munster Senior Hurling Championship (2): 1908, 1909

References

1887 births
1962 deaths
Thurles Sarsfields hurlers
Tipperary inter-county hurlers
All-Ireland Senior Hurling Championship winners
Hurling selectors